Roberto Juceli Weber (born 5 April 1968), commonly known as Roberto Gaúcho, is a retired Brazilian footballer.

Career statistics

Club

Notes

References

1968 births
Living people
Brazilian footballers
Brazilian expatriate footballers
Association football forwards
Joinville Esporte Clube players
Grêmio Foot-Ball Porto Alegrense players
Coritiba Foot Ball Club players
Criciúma Esporte Clube players
Esporte Clube Vitória players
CR Vasco da Gama players
Guarani FC players
Cruzeiro Esporte Clube players
Club Atlético Huracán footballers
Miami Fusion players
Campeonato Brasileiro Série A players
Major League Soccer players
Brazilian expatriate sportspeople in Argentina
Expatriate footballers in Argentina
Brazilian expatriate sportspeople in the United States
Expatriate soccer players in the United States